Grudge is a 2021 Turkish film directed by Türkan Derya and starring Yılmaz Erdoğan, Cem Yiğit Üzümoğlu

Cast 
 Yılmaz Erdoğan as Harun
 Cem Yiğit Üzümoğlu
 Rüzgar Aksoy
 Ahmet Mümtaz Taylan
 Metehan Parıltı as Aslan
 Yosi Mizrahi
 Elif Gizem Aykul
 Yasin Sofuoglu

References

External links 
 
 

2021 films
Turkish crime drama films
2020s Turkish-language films
Turkish-language Netflix original films